This is a list of the bird species recorded on the Coral Sea Islands. The avifauna of the Coral Sea Islands include a total of 45 species. 

This list's taxonomic treatment (designation and sequence of orders, families and species) and nomenclature (common and scientific names) follow the conventions of The Clements Checklist of Birds of the World, 2022 edition. The family accounts at the beginning of each heading reflect this taxonomy, as do the species counts found in each family account. Introduced and accidental species are included in the total counts for the Coral Sea Islands.

The following tags have been used to highlight several categories. The commonly occurring native species do not fall into any of these categories.

(A) Accidental - a species that rarely or accidentally occurs on the Coral Sea Islands.

Pigeons and doves
Order: ColumbiformesFamily: Columbidae

Pigeons and doves are stout-bodied birds with short necks and short slender bills with a fleshy cere.

Superb fruit-dove, Ptilinopus superbus (A)

Rails, gallinules, and coots
Order: GruiformesFamily: Rallidae

Rallidae is a large family of small to medium-sized birds which includes the rails, crakes, coots and gallinules. Typically they inhabit dense vegetation in damp environments near lakes, swamps or rivers. In general they are shy and secretive birds, making them difficult to observe. Most species have strong legs and long toes which are well adapted to soft uneven surfaces. They tend to have short, rounded wings and to be weak fliers.

Buff-banded rail, Gallirallus philippensis

Plovers and lapwings
Order: CharadriiformesFamily: Charadriidae

The family Charadriidae includes the plovers, dotterels and lapwings. They are small to medium-sized birds with compact bodies, short, thick necks and long, usually pointed, wings. They are found in open country worldwide, mostly in habitats near water.

Pacific golden-plover, Pluvialis fulva

Sandpipers and allies
Order: CharadriiformesFamily: Scolopacidae

Scolopacidae is a large diverse family of small to medium-sized shorebirds including the sandpipers, curlews, godwits, shanks, tattlers, woodcocks, snipes, dowitchers and phalaropes. The majority of these species eat small invertebrates picked out of the mud or soil. Variation in length of legs and bills enables multiple species to feed in the same habitat, particularly on the coast, without direct competition for food.

Ruddy turnstone, Arenaria interpres 
Wandering tattler, Tringa incana

Gulls, terns, and skimmers
Order: CharadriiformesFamily: Laridae

Laridae is a family of medium to large seabirds, the gulls, terns, and skimmers. Gulls are typically grey or white, often with black markings on the head or wings. They have stout, longish bills and webbed feet. Terns are a group of generally medium to large seabirds typically with grey or white plumage, often with black markings on the head. Most terns hunt fish by diving but some pick insects off the surface of fresh water. Terns are generally long-lived birds, with several species known to live in excess of 30 years.

Silver gull, Chroicocephalus novaehollandiae 
Brown noddy, Anous stolidus
Black noddy, Anous minutus
White tern, Gygis alba (A)
Sooty tern, Onychoprion fuscatus 
Bridled tern, Onychoprion anaethetus 
Little tern, Sternula albifrons (A)
Australian fairy tern, Sternula nereis (A)
Caspian tern, Hydroprogne caspia 
Black-naped tern, Sterna sumatrana 
Great crested tern, Thalasseus bergii

Tropicbirds
Order: PhaethontiformesFamily: Phaethontidae

Tropicbirds are slender white birds of tropical oceans, with exceptionally long central tail feathers. Their long wings have black markings, as does the head.

Red-tailed tropicbird, Phaethon rubricauda

Albatrosses
Order: ProcellariiformesFamily: Diomedeidae

The albatrosses are among the largest of flying birds, and the great albatrosses from the genus Diomedea have the largest wingspans of any extant birds.

Buller's albatross, Thalassarche bulleriWandering albatross, Diomedea exulans

Southern storm-petrelsOrder: ProcellariiformesFamily: Oceanitidae

The southern storm-petrels are relatives of the petrels and are the smallest seabirds. They feed on planktonic crustaceans and small fish picked from the surface, typically while hovering. The flight is fluttering and sometimes bat-like.

Wilson's storm-petrel, Oceanites oceanicus
White-faced storm-petrel, Pelagodroma marina

Shearwaters and petrelsOrder: ProcellariiformesFamily: Procellariidae

The procellariids are the main group of medium-sized "true petrels", characterised by united nostrils with medium septum and a long outer functional primary.

Great-winged petrel, Pterodroma macroptera
Gray-faced petrel, Pterodroma gouldi(A)
Kermadec petrel, Pterodroma neglecta(A)
White-necked petrel, Pterodroma cervicalis
Black-winged petrel, Pterodroma nigripennis
Gould's petrel, Pterodroma leucoptera
Collared petrel, Pterodroma brevipes (A)
Tahiti petrel, Pseudobulweria rostrata (A)
Parkinson's petrel, Procellaria parkinsoni
Flesh-footed shearwater, Ardenna carneipes 
Wedge-tailed shearwater, Ardenna pacifica 
Buller's shearwater, Ardenna bulleri 
Sooty shearwater, Ardenna grisea 
Short-tailed shearwater, Ardenna tenuirostris
Hutton's shearwater, Puffinus huttoni  
Fluttering shearwater, Puffinus gavia 

FrigatebirdsOrder: SuliformesFamily: Fregatidae

Frigatebirds are large seabirds usually found over tropical oceans. They are large, black, or black-and-white, with long wings and deeply forked tails. The males have coloured inflatable throat pouches. They do not swim or walk and cannot take off from a flat surface. Having the largest wingspan-to-body-weight ratio of any bird, they are essentially aerial, able to stay aloft for more than a week.

Lesser frigatebird, Fregata ariel
Great frigatebird, Fregata minor

Boobies and gannetsOrder: SuliformesFamily: Sulidae

The sulids comprise the gannets and boobies. Both groups are medium-large coastal seabirds that plunge-dive for fish.

Masked booby, Sula dactylatra
Brown booby, Sula leucogaster
Red-footed booby, Sula sula
Australasian gannet, Morus serrator

Herons, egrets, and bitternsOrder: PelecaniformesFamily: Ardeidae

The family Ardeidae contains the bitterns, herons and egrets. Herons and egrets are medium to large wading birds with long necks and legs. Bitterns tend to be shorter necked and more wary. Members of Ardeidae fly with their necks retracted, unlike other long-necked birds such as storks, ibises and spoonbills.

Cattle egret, Bubulcus ibis 

Falcons and caracarasOrder: FalconiformesFamily''': Falconidae

Falconidae is a family of diurnal birds of prey. They differ from hawks, eagles, and kites in that they kill with their beaks instead of their talons.

Peregrine falcon, Falco peregrinus''

See also
List of birds
Lists of birds by region

References

Coral Sea Islands